National Highway 766 (NH 766) (previously NH-212) is a National Highway in Southern India. NH 766 connects Kozhikode in Kerala with Kollegal in Karnataka via Mysore. Of the total distance of 272 km, 117 km is in Kerala and 155 is in Karnataka. At Kollegal, it joins National Highway 948, which connects Bengaluru and Coimbatore. The highway passes through dense forests of Western ghats of India. The NH-766 passes through 19.7 km Bandipur National Park and Wayanad wild life sanctuary.

The section of the road from Lakkidi in Wayanad to Adivaram (Thamarassery) called as Thamarassery Churam (A hill highway with nine hairpin bends) offers a scenic drive.

Route

In Kerala
 Kozhikode
 Kunnamangalam
 Koduvally
 Thamarassery
 Vythiri
 Kalpetta
 Meenangadi
 Sultan Bathery
 Muthanga

In Karnataka
 Gundlupete
Begur
 Nanjangud
 Mysore
 T Narsipur
 Kollegal

Night Traffic ban at Bandipura
The Karnataka government banned  night traffic through the road passing through Bandipur National Park as conservationists argued that it is disturbing the wildlife from 9 P.M up to 6 A.M. It is closed for 2 wheelers from 6 P.M. to 6 A.M. The alternate road to use during night hours is, leave NH 766 at Kalpetta and proceed to Mysore through Mananthavady, Kutta, Gonikoppal, and Hunsur. This alternate route is much longer and completely bypasses Sulthan Bathery, Gundlupet and Nanjangud.

See also
 National Highways Development Project
 National Highway 181 (India)
 National Highway 948 (India)
 National Highway 150A (India)

References

External links

 Road network in Kerala
 Bengaluru to Wyanad Road Route

766
766
National highways in India
Mountain passes of the Western Ghats
Mountain passes of Karnataka
Mountain passes of Kerala
Roads in Kozhikode district
Roads in Chamarajanagar district
Roads in Mysore district